Nagappa Sunil Kumar (born 12 June 1985), known professionally as Darling Krishna, is an Indian actor who primarily works in Kannada films. Krishna made his film debut with Jackie (2010). For his performance in the 2013 film Madarangi, he received SIIMA Award for Best Male Debut - Kannada nomination.

Post his debut, Krishna starred in the Kannada soap-opera Krishna Rukmini. Krishna's career marked a turning point with his directorial debut Love Mocktail (2020) and its sequel Love Mocktail 2 (2022). He won Filmfare Critics Award for Best Actor – Kannada and SIIMA Award for Best Film – Kannada, for the former. Krishna is married to his co-actor Milana Nagaraj.

Early life
Krishna was born as Sunil Kumar N. on 12 June 1985 in Mysore, Karnataka. His father Nagappa, is a retired police officer. He completed his MBA from Bangalore.

Career

Debut and early work (2010-2019) 
Krishna started his career as an assistant director for Duniya Soori in Jackie in 2010. He also played a CID officer in the film. He then did a special role in Hudugaru in 2011. Krishna then portrayed the titular role in the Kannada soap-opera "Krishna Rukmini".

Krishna's first lead role came in 2013, with Madarangi opposite Sushma Raj. It was abox office success. Deccan Herald noted, "Krishna manages to hold his own but a smug smile or a fixed grimace won’t carry the day for long." He next portrayed a MLA aspirant in 2014 in Jolly Baru Matthu Poli Hudugaru opposite Mansi Vasudeva.

He had two releases in 2015. He first appeared in Rudra Tandava. The New Indian Express stated, "Krishna is placed well in his role." He next portrayed the titular role opposite Vaishali Deepak in Charlie. Krishna had two releases in 2016 too. He first appeared in Doddmane Hudga, a commercial success. Times of India mentioned, "Darling Krishna has a role that is pivotal to the film's plot and delivers." He next portrayed John in John Jani Janardhan.

In 2017, he portrayed a bar accountant opposite Teju in Mumbai. Times of India said, "Krishna has all the qualities of a good commercial hero, but the film fails him despite him putting his all." In 2018, he portrayed Raam opposite Shravya Rao in Huccha 2. Times of India mentioned, "Krishna is earnest as Raam and has done a good job."

Directorial debut and success (2020-2022) 
Krishna ventured into direction and production in 2020 with Love Mocktail, which proved as a major turning point in his career. He portrayed a software engineer opposite Milana Nagaraj, who co-produced the film. It became a critical and commercial success. The News Minute noted, "Darling Krishna has managed both acting and direction with responsibility. His performance is up to the mark, especially as a doting husband." The New Indian Express stated, "Krishna's role as Adi, who comes in different shades, is done with perfection."

In 2021, he appeared in a special song in Kotigobba 3. He portrayed a steward in SriKrishna@gmail.com opposite Bhavana. Deccan Herald stated, "Darling Krishna's easy-style acting is likebale."

Krishna had four releases in 2022. He first reprised his role in Love Mocktail 2 opposite Milana Nagaraj. It became a box office success. Deccan Herald stated, "Krishna sticks to the strengths of the much-loved 2020 romantic drama and does his part well." Times of India stated that Krishna is "endearing and entertaining". He next appeared opposite Meenakshi Dixit in the much delayed film Local Train. Krishna appeared opposite Sangeetha Sringeri and Roshni Prakash in Lucky Man. The Cinema Express mentioned, "Krishna delivers a complete performance. He fits perfectly into all phases of the character." In his last film of the year, he portrayed a IT engineer opposite Nishvika Naidu and Megha Shetty. News18 wrote, "Darling Krishna’s performance will keep you glued to your seats."

Career progression (2023-present) 
In 2023, Krishna appeared opposite Nimika Ratnakar in Mr. Bachelor. Cinema Express stated, "Krishna brings in all-around entertainment and gets to showcase a bit of his dancing skills." He then portrayed a software engineer opposite Milana Nagaraj in Love Birds. The New Indian Express found his performance to be "natural and poignant". While Times of India wrote, "Krishna and Milana impress with their performance as a couple that is very much in love, but are unable to see through their differences." 

Krishna will next appear in Love Me Or Hate Me opposite Rachita Ram, Sugar Factory and Kausalya Supraja Rama.

Personal life 
Sunil Kumar changed his name to Krishna, after the success of his first Kannada serial, Krishna Rukmini (2011).

Krishna met actress Milana Nagaraj on the sets of the 2013 film Nam Duniya Nam Style. They eventually started dating in 2015. Krishna married Milana Nagaraj on 14 February 2021, in a private traditional ceremony on the outskirts of Bengaluru.

Other work and media image 
Krishna started his own production house "Krishna Talkies" in 2020. He has co-produced Love Mocktail (2020) and Love Mocktail 2 (2022) under the same. He won SIIMA Award for Best Film – Kannada for the former. He will next produce Kousalya Supraja Rama.

Krishna is one of the most promising actor in Kannada cinema. His first film as the lead, Madarangi, earned him the title Darling. In 2020, he ranked 12th in Bangalore Times' 30 Most Desirable Men list.

Filmography

Films

Other crew positions

Television

Accolades

See also 
 List of Indian film actors

References

External links 
 

1985 births
Male actors in Kannada cinema
Living people
Indian male film actors
Indian male television actors
21st-century Indian male actors
Male actors from Mysore